Finn's Point Rear Range Light is located at the intersection of Fort Mott and Lighthouse roads on Finns Point in Pennsville Township of Salem County, New Jersey. The range light was added to the National Register of Historic Places on August 30, 1978, for its significance in engineering. It has been incorporated into the Supawna Meadows National Wildlife Refuge.

History and description
The range light was built 1876–1877 by the Kellogg Bridge Co. of Buffalo, New York. The platform at the top is reached by a cast iron spiral staircase encased in a wrought iron cylinder. The use of wrought iron was atypical for this type of tower. It had resistance to corrosion and cracking. According to the nomination form, this tower is the only extant structure of this type in the state. The light was taken out of service  and the lenses removed.

See also
National Register of Historic Places listings in Salem County, New Jersey

References

External links
 

1876 establishments in New Jersey
Lighthouses completed in 1876
Lighthouses on the National Register of Historic Places in New Jersey
National Register of Historic Places in Salem County, New Jersey
New Jersey Register of Historic Places
Pennsville Township, New Jersey
Transportation buildings and structures in Salem County, New Jersey